Taksiseh may refer to:
 Taksiseh-ye Olya
 Taksiseh-ye Sofla